Treasury Island frog may refer to:

 Treasury Island tree frog (Litoria thesaurensis), a frog in the family Hylidae found in Indonesia, Papua New Guinea, and Solomon Islands
 Treasury Island webbed frog (Discodeles bufoniformis), a frog in the family Ceratobatrachidae endemic to the Solomon Islands archipelago

Animal common name disambiguation pages